Gmina Grabów is a rural gmina (administrative district) in Łęczyca County, Łódź Voivodeship, in central Poland.

Villages
Gmina Grabów contains the villages and settlements of Besiekiery, Biała Góra, Borów, Borucice, Bowętów, Brudzeń, Budki, Byszew, Chorki, Gać, Golbice, Goszczędza, Grabów, Jastrzębia, Jaworów, Kadzidłowa, Kotków, Ksawerów, Kurzjama, Leszno, Nagórki, Nowa Sobótka, Nowy Besk, Odechów, Ostrówek, Piaski, Pieczew, Piotrkówek, Radzyń, Sławęcin, Smardzew, Smolice, Sobótka-Kolonia, Srebrna, Stara Sobótka, Stary Besk, Wygorzele, Żaczki and Źrebięta.

Neighbouring gminas
Gmina Grabów is bordered by the gminas of Chodów, Dąbie, Daszyna, Kłodawa, Łęczyca, Olszówka and Świnice Warckie.

References
Polish official population figures 2006

Grabow
Łęczyca County